First Rhapsody may refer to the following musical works (arranged alphabetically by surname of composer):

 Hugo Alfvén: Swedish Rhapsody No. 1 for orchestra (1903)
 Béla Bartók: Rhapsody No. 1 (Bartók) for piano and orchestra (1928)
 Claude Debussy: First Rhapsody for clarinet and accompaniment, French title Première rhapsodie (190910)
 George Enescu: The first of the two Romanian Rhapsodies (Enescu) for orchestra (1901)
 John Ireland: First Rhapsody (John Ireland) for piano solo (1906)
 Franz Liszt: Hungarian Rhapsody No. 1 for piano solo (1851)